Euell Theophilus Gibbons (September 8, 1911 – December 29, 1975) was an outdoorsman and early health food advocate, promoting eating wild foods during the 1960s.

Early career
Gibbons was born in Clarksville, Texas, on September 8, 1911, and spent much of his youth in the hilly terrain of northwestern New Mexico. His father drifted from job to job, usually taking his family (a wife and four children) with him.

During one difficult interval of homesteading, Gibbons began foraging for local plants and berries to supplement the family diet. After leaving home at 15, he drifted throughout the Southwest, finding work as a dairyman, carpenter, trapper, gold panner, and cowboy. The early years of the Dust Bowl era found Gibbons in California, where he lived as a self-described “bindle stiff” (hobo) and, in sympathy with labor causes, began writing Communist Party leaflets. Later in the 1930s he settled in Seattle, served a stint in the Army, married, and worked as a carpenter, surveyor, and boatbuilder.

During the late 1930s, Gibbons was still giving "more time to his political activity than to his work, and more time to wild food than to politics." After the Soviet Union invaded Poland in 1939, however, he renounced Communism and spent most of World War II in Hawaii, building and repairing boats for the Navy. His first marriage, Gibbons recalled, became a "casualty of the war," and in the postwar years he chose the life of a beachcomber on the Hawaiian Islands.

After entering the University of Hawaii as a 36-year-old freshman, Gibbons majored in anthropology and won the university's creative-writing prize. In 1948, he married Freda Fryer, a teacher, and both decided to join the Society of Friends (the Quakers), stating "I became a Quaker because it was the only group I could join without pretending to have beliefs that I didn't have or concealing beliefs that I did have."

They relocated to the mainland in 1953, where, after a failed attempt to found a cooperative agricultural community in Indiana, Gibbons became a staff member at Pendle Hill Quaker Study Center near Philadelphia, cooking breakfast for everyone every day. Around 1960, through his wife's urging and support, he followed through on his earlier aspirations and turned to writing.

Literary career and celebrity
At the request of a New York literary agent, Gibbons agreed to rework the draft of his novel (about a schoolteacher who wowed café society with opulent meals of foraged foodstuffs) into a straightforward book on wild food. Capitalizing on the growing return-to-nature movement in 1962, the resulting work, Stalking the Wild Asparagus, was an instant success. Gibbons followed it up with the cookbooks Stalking the Blue-Eyed Scallop in 1964 and Stalking the Healthful Herbs in 1966. He was widely published in various magazines, including two pieces in National Geographic.

The first article, in the July 1972 issue, described a two-week stay on an uninhabited island off the coast of Maine where Gibbons, with his wife Freda and a few family friends, relied solely on local resources for sustenance. The second, in the August 1973 issue, featured Gibbons, along with granddaughter Colleen, grandson Mike, and daughter-in-law Patricia, stalking wild foods in four western states.

His publishing success brought him fame. He made guest appearances on The Tonight Show and The Sonny & Cher Comedy Hour, and received an honorary doctorate from Susquehanna University. A 1974 television commercial for Post Grape-Nuts cereal featured him asking viewers, "Ever eat a pine tree? Many parts are edible." While he recommended Grape Nuts over pine trees (including the oft-repeated quote that Grape Nuts' taste reminded him "of wild hickory nuts"), the commercials gained attention and fueled Gibbons' celebrity status.

Johnny Carson joked about sending Gibbons a "lumber-gram", and Gibbons himself joined in the humor; when presented with a wooden award plaque by Sonny and Cher, he good-naturedly took a bite out of it (the "plaque" was actually an edible prop). He was satirized by John Byner on the Carol Burnett Show episode which aired October 6, 1973, shown eating tree parts and asking related questions, including "Ever lick a river?" In a 1974 skit on the children's television program The Electric Company, cast member Skip Hinnant (as Early Gibbons) was a proponent of eating items starting with the prefix "ST-," including a tree stump, a staircase (with a "first step," presumably made of wood), and sticks and stones.

In Larry Groce's 1976 novelty hit "Junk Food Junkie", the singer extols his healthy lifestyle, claiming to be "a friend of old Euell Gibbons". (The record was released after Gibbons' death.)

Often mistaken for a survivalist, Gibbons was simply an advocate of nutritious but neglected plants, which he typically prepared not in the wild, but in the kitchen with abundant use of spices, butter and garnishes. Several of his books discuss what he called "wild parties"—dinner parties where guests were served dishes prepared from plants gathered in the wild. His favorite recommendations included lamb's quarters, rose hips, young dandelion shoots, stinging nettle and cattails. He often pointed out that gardeners threw away the tastier, more healthful crop when they removed such "weeds" as purslane and amaranth from among their spinach plants.

Gibbons is considered a saint by the God's Gardeners, a fictional religious sect that is the focus of Margaret Atwood's 2009 novel The Year of the Flood.

Death

Gibbons died on December 29, 1975, aged 64, at Sunbury Community Hospital in Sunbury, Pennsylvania, of a ruptured aortic aneurysm, a common complication from Marfan syndrome.

Bibliography
 Stalking the Wild Asparagus (1962)
 Stalking the Blue-Eyed Scallop (1964)
 Stalking the Healthful Herbs (1966)
 Stalking the Good Life (1966)
 Beachcomber's Handbook (1967)
 A Wild Way to Eat (1967) for the Hurricane Island Outward Bound School
 Stalking the Faraway Places (1973)
 (collected in) American Food Writing: An Anthology with Classic Recipes, ed. Molly O'Neill (Library of America, 2007) 
 Feast on a Diabetic Diet (1973)
 Euell Gibbons' Handbook of Edible Wild Plants (1979)

References

External links
 The Plowboy Interview: Euell Gibbons, Mother Earth News, May–June 1972.
 Euell Gibbons Biography by John Kallas, Ph.D., Institute for the Study of Edible Wild Plants and Other Foragables.  Article with Photograph
 Euell Gibbons Biography by John Sunder.  The Handbook of Texas Online
 New York Times appreciation of Euell Gibbons by John McPhee Wild Man
 Euell Gibbons Post Grape Nuts , 1974.

1911 births
1975 deaths
Writers from New Mexico
American food writers
American nature writers
American non-fiction outdoors writers
Diet food advocates
Deaths from aortic aneurysm
20th-century American non-fiction writers
20th-century American male writers
People from Clarksville, Texas
American male non-fiction writers
People with Marfan syndrome